Walter Leon Cutler (born November 25, 1931 in Boston, Massachusetts) is an international consultant and advisor, with a focus on the Middle East, and a former U.S. Ambassador.

Cutler was previously a career diplomat, serving twice as Ambassador to the Kingdom of Saudi Arabia (1984-87, 1988-89); Tunisia (1982-84); and Congo-Zaire (1975-79). He was Ambassador-Designate to the Islamic Republic of Iran before diplomatic relations were broken in 1980. Other foreign service included opening the first American post in Yaounde, Cameroon; political officer in Algiers just after Algeria's independence; consul in Tabriz, Iran; political-military officer in Seoul, Korea, at the time of North Korea's capture of the U.S intelligence ship Pueblo; and political officer in Saigon during the Vietnam war.  At the Department of State he served as Executive Assistant to the Secretary of State; Special Assistant for Vietnam Negotiations; Director of Central African Affairs; and Senior Deputy Assistant Secretary of State for Congressional Relations. In 1987-88 he was a research professor of diplomacy at Georgetown University.

From 1989 to 2006, Cutler was President of Meridian International Center, a not-for-profit institution in Washington, D.C. dedicated to promoting global understanding through the exchange of people, ideas and the arts. He now serves as President Emeritus.

Currently residing in Washington with his wife Isabel (Didi), a photographer, Cutler is a member of The Council on Foreign Relations, The American Academy of Diplomacy, The Association for Diplomatic Studies and Training, The Foreign Service Association, The Middle East Institute, The National Council on U.S.-Arab Relations, Tunisian-American Young Professionals, and GlobalTies US. Born in Boston, Massachusetts, he is a graduate of Wesleyan University in Middletown, Connecticut, and the Fletcher School of International Law and Diplomacy in Medford, Massachusetts. He served two years in the U.S. Army.

References

External links
Walter Leon Cutler entry at The Political Graveyard
2002 interview with Voice of America
2004 interview with Voice of America

Walter Leon Cutler at the State Department's Office of the Historian

1931 births
Living people
Ambassadors of the United States to the Democratic Republic of the Congo
Ambassadors of the United States to Saudi Arabia
Ambassadors of the United States to Tunisia
The Fletcher School at Tufts University alumni
People from Boston
United States Army soldiers
Wesleyan University alumni
United States Foreign Service personnel
20th-century American diplomats